Stigmata is a German record label.

Founded in 1999, as the underground offspring of studio partners Chris Liebing and André Walter, their legendary Stigmata series has become a unique and widespread driving force in the global techno scene.

See also 
 List of record labels

External links
 Official site
 Stigmata Records' profile at Discogs

References
 

German record labels
Record labels established in 1999
Techno record labels
1999 establishments in Germany